Women's basketball team Dynamo Kyiv (Dynamo NPU Kyiv) is a successful Ukrainian women's basketball team. Established in the 1950s, this is the only team from Ukraine who became a champion of the USSR. Dynamo Kyiv is also the only team from Ukraine that has won a European tournament. After the collapse of the USSR the team continued its participation in the Ukrainian Women's Basketball Championship. The club was founded in 1927.

Success Team
Soviet Women's Basketball Championship (3):
  1949, 1991, 1992
  1945

Ukrainian Women's Basketball SuperLeague (8):
  1992, 1993, 1994, 1995, 1996, 2012, 2013, 2015
  1997, 2001, 2002, 2010
  1999

Ronchetti Cup (1):
  1988

EuroLeague Women:
  1992

External links
Official website: Ofitsiinyi Sait BK "Dynamo" Kyiv
UKRBasket
Eurobasket
Oofb.odessa.ua

Women's basketball teams in Ukraine
Sport in Kyiv
Basketball teams established in 1927